Topland Group a British property and investment company headed by brothers Eddie and Sol Zakay. 

In 2014, Topland was described as one of the world's largest privately owned property and investment groups. It has "become a major player in the regional UK hotel market, having spent £200m on acquiring 28 hotels."

The company head office is at 55 Baker Street, London.

History

Founders
Eddie Zakay was born in July 1950 and Sol Zakay was born in June 1952.

Origins
Eddie and Sol Zakay started their property business in Britain during the 1980s property boom. They later expanded into the U.S. and Middle Eastern markets.The Times described the brothers as having made their money principally through sale and leaseback deals with supermarkets, particularly an important deal with Marks & Spencer in 2001.

Sol Zakay left Britain to live in Israel. In 2013, he returned to the UK and took over as chairman and CEO of Topland from Eddie, who became deputy chairman.

Topland Group is one of the world's largest privately owned property and investment groups. The company owns property in the UK and in 2013 bought 12 out of the 15 hotels (all in the UK) owned by the bankrupt Menzies Hotels for about $135 million. They own a number of other UK hotels, including Bath's Royal Crescent Hotel, the Hilton Brighton Metropole, the Glasgow Hilton and several Thistle Hotels, six in central London and one in Edinburgh.

According to The Sunday Times Rich List in 2020 the founders' net worth was approximately £3.61 billion.

The company has since diversified into natural resources and renewable energy.
Topland's principal activity is commercial real estate, with a portfolio of over 220 properties, valued in the region of £3 billion. Topland also has a hotel portfolio consisting of 40 hotels, including the Hallmark Hotel Group, the Royal Crescent Hotel, in the Royal Crescent in Bath, the Hilton Brighton Metropole, the Glasgow Hilton and several Thistle Hotels, six in central London, one in Straford Upon Avon (The Welcombe Hotel) and one in Edinburgh.

Legal dispute
In 2012, The Guardian reported that Topland was being sued by the UK's Ministry of Justice, having "conspired with a property agent in 2002 to extract inflated rents from the government on one of its central London buildings which houses the main London divorce courts". The UK government has accused Topland of "deceit, fraud by bribery, dishonest assistance and breach of confidence" and "unlawful conspiracy". The case was "settled out of court on confidential terms".

Philanthropy
In 2010, Topland held a business lunch at the Grosvenor House Hotel in London in conjunction with Jewish Care, at which £241,000 was raised for the charity's causes.

References

Property companies of the United Kingdom
Companies based in the City of Westminster